Baguio is a city in the Philippines.

Baguio may also refer to:
 Baguio Villa, a housing estate in Hong Kong
 Metro Baguio, an agglomeration of the city of Baguio and five municipalities of Benguet in the Philippines
 Baguio Airport, an airport in Baguio, Philippines
 University of Baguio, a university in Baguio, Philippines

People with the name
 Baguio Wong, table tennis player from Hong Kong
 Cyrus Baguio (born 1980), Filipino professional basketball player

See also
 Bagyo, typhoons in the Philippines